Elena Erbakova (born 1996) is a Russian theatre and film actress, best known for one of the main roles in the epic drama directed by Anton Megerdichev Land of Legends (2022).

Biography
Elena Erbakova was born on August 21, 1996 in village Baitog of Irkutsk Oblast. Since childhood, Elena was fond of performing arts, wrote poetry on her own and dreamed of taking part in Shakespeare's productions after school.

In 2018 she graduated from the East Siberian State Institute of Culture.

In 2017-2020 worked at the Bestuzhev State Russian Drama Theater (Ulan-Ude).

Filmography
 Ulan-Ude, I love you! (2018) as Polina
 Unprincipled 2 (2021) as Tonya (TV Series)
 6 Easy Pieces (2021) as Polina
 Land of Legends  (2022) as Tiche, lamia the sorceress, Prince Mikhail's wife

Awards and nominations

References

External links
 

1996 births
Living people
Russian film actresses
Russian stage actresses
Russian television actresses
21st-century Russian actresses
People from Ekhirit-Bulagatsky District
Buryat people